Inner Mongolia, officially the Inner Mongolia Autonomous Region (IMAR), is an autonomous region of the People's Republic of China. Its border includes most of the length of China's border with the country of Mongolia. Inner Mongolia also accounts for a small section of China's border with Russia (Zabaykalsky Krai). Its capital is Hohhot; other major cities include Baotou, Chifeng, Tongliao, and Ordos.

The autonomous region was established in 1947, incorporating the areas of the former Republic of China provinces of Suiyuan, Chahar, Rehe, Liaobei, and Xing'an, along with the northern parts of Gansu and Ningxia.

Due to its long span from east to west, Inner Mongolia is geographically divided into eastern and western divisions. The eastern division is often included in Northeastern China (Dongbei), with major cities including Tongliao, Chifeng, Hailar, and Ulanhot. The western division is included in North China, with major cities including Baotou and Hohhot. It recorded a population of 24,706,321 in the 2010 census, accounting for 1.84% of Mainland China's total population. Inner Mongolia is the country's 23rd most populous province-level division. The majority of the population in the region are Han Chinese, with a sizeable Mongol minority close to 5,000,000 (2019) which is the largest Mongolian population in the world (bigger than that of the country Mongolia). Inner Mongolia is one of the most economically developed provinces in China with annual GDP per capita close to US$13,000 (2019), often ranked 5th in the nation. The official languages are Mandarin and Mongolian, the latter of which is written in the traditional Mongolian script, as opposed to the Mongolian Cyrillic alphabet, which is used in the state of Mongolia (formerly often described as Outer Mongolia).

Etymology 

In Chinese, the region is known as "Inner Mongolia", where the terms of "Inner and "Outer" are derived from Manchu dorgi/tulergi (cf. Mongolian dotugadu/gadagadu). Inner Mongolia is distinct from Outer Mongolia, which was a term used by the Republic of China and previous governments to refer to what is now the independent state of Mongolia and the Republic of Tuva in Russia. The term Inner  (Nei) referred to the Nei Fan  (Inner Tributary), i.e., those descendants of Genghis Khan who were granted the title khan (king) in the Ming and Qing dynasties and lived in part of southern Mongolia. The region is sometimes called Southern Mongolia by local separatists and Mongolian irredentists.

History 

Much of what is known about the history of Greater Mongolia, including Inner Mongolia, is known through Chinese chronicles and historians. Before the rise of the Mongols in the 13th century, what is now central and western Inner Mongolia, especially the Hetao region, alternated in control between Chinese agriculturalists in the south, and Xiongnu, Xianbei, Khitan, Jurchen, Tujue, and nomadic Mongol of the north. The historical narrative of what is now Eastern Inner Mongolia mostly consists of alternations between different Tungusic and Mongol tribes, rather than the struggle between nomads and Chinese agriculturalists.

Early history 
Slab Grave cultural monuments are found in Northern, Central and Eastern Mongolia, Inner Mongolia, North-Western China, Southern, Central-Eastern and Southern Baikal territory. Mongolian scholars prove that this culture related to the Proto-Mongols.

During the Zhou dynasty, Central and Western Inner Mongolia (the Hetao region and surrounding areas) were inhabited by nomadic peoples such as the Loufan, Linhu and Dí, while Eastern Inner Mongolia was inhabited by the Donghu. During the Warring States period, King Wuling (340–295 BC) of the state of Zhao based in what is now Hebei and Shanxi Provinces pursued an expansionist policy towards the region. After destroying the Dí state of Zhongshan in what is now Hebei province, he defeated the Linhu and Loufan and created the Yunzhong Commandery near modern Hohhot. King Wuling of Zhao also built a long wall stretching through the Hetao region. After Qin Shi Huang created the first unified Chinese empire in 221 BC, he sent the general Meng Tian to drive the Xiongnu from the region and incorporated the old Zhao wall into the Qin dynasty Great Wall of China. He also maintained two commanderies in the region: Jiuyuan and Yunzhong and moved 30,000 households there to solidify the region. After the Qin dynasty collapsed in 206 BC, these efforts were abandoned.

During the Western Han dynasty, Emperor Wu sent the general Wei Qing to reconquer the Hetao region from the Xiongnu in 127 BC. After the conquest, Emperor Wu continued the policy of building settlements in Hetao to defend against the Xiong-Nu. In that same year, he established the commanderies of Shuofang and Wuyuan in Hetao. At the same time, what is now Eastern Inner Mongolia was controlled by the Xianbei, who would, later on, eclipse the Xiongnu in power and influence.

During the Eastern Han dynasty (25–220 AD), Xiongnu who surrendered to the Han dynasty began to be settled in Hetao and intermingled with the Han immigrants in the area. Later on, during the Western Jin dynasty, it was a Xiongnu noble from Hetao, Liu Yuan, who established the Han Zhao kingdom in the region, thereby beginning the Sixteen Kingdoms period that saw the disintegration of northern China under a variety of Han and non-Han (including Xiongnu and Xianbei) regimes.

The Sui dynasty (581–618) and Tang dynasty (618–907) re-established a unified Chinese empire and like their predecessors, they conquered and settled people into Hetao, though once again these efforts were aborted when the Tang empire began to collapse. Hetao (along with the rest of what now consists Inner Mongolia) was then taken over by the Khitan Empire (Liao dynasty), founded by the Khitans, a nomadic people originally from what is now the southern part of Manchuria and Eastern Inner Mongolia. They were followed by the Western Xia of the Tanguts, who took control of what is now the western part of Inner Mongolia (including Western Hetao). The Khitans were later replaced by the Jurchens, precursors to the modern Manchus, who established the Jin dynasty over Manchuria and Northern China.

Mongol and Ming periods 

After Genghis Khan unified the Mongol tribes in 1206 and founded the Mongol Empire, the Tangut Western Xia empire was ultimately conquered in 1227, and the Jurchen Jin dynasty fell in 1234. In 1271, Kublai Khan, the grandson of Genghis Khan established the Yuan dynasty. Kublai Khan's summer capital Shangdu (aka Xanadu) was located near present-day Dolonnor. During that time Ongud and Khunggirad peoples dominated the area of what is now Inner Mongolia. After the Yuan dynasty was overthrown by the Han-led Ming dynasty in 1368, the Ming captured parts of Inner Mongolia including Shangdu and Yingchang. The Ming rebuilt the Great Wall of China at its present location, which roughly follows the southern border of the modern Inner Mongolia Autonomous Region (though it deviates significantly at the Hebei-Inner Mongolia border). The Ming established the Three Guards composed of the Mongols there. Soon after the Tumu incident in 1449, when the Oirat ruler Esen taishi captured the Chinese emperor, Mongols flooded south from Outer Mongolia to Inner Mongolia. Thus from then on until 1635, Inner Mongolia was the political and cultural center of the Mongols during the Northern Yuan dynasty.

Qing period 

The eastern Mongol tribes near and in Manchuria, particularly the Khorchin and Southern Khalkha in today's Inner Mongolia intermarried, formed alliances with, and fought against the Jurchen tribes until Nurhaci, the founder of the new Jin dynasty, consolidated his control over all groups in the area in 1593. The Manchus gained far-reaching control of the Inner Mongolian tribes in 1635, when Ligden Khan's son surrendered the Chakhar Mongol tribes to the Manchus. The Manchus subsequently invaded Ming China in 1644, bringing it under the control of their newly established Qing dynasty. Under the Qing dynasty (1636–1912), Greater Mongolia was administered in a different way for each region:

 "Outer Mongolia": This region corresponds to the modern state of Mongolia, plus the Russian-administered region of Tannu Uriankhai, and a part of northern Xinjiang. It included the four leagues (aimag) of the Khalkha Mongols north of the Gobi, as well as the Tannu Uriankhai and Khovd regions in northwestern Mongolia, which were overseen by the General of Uliastai from the city of Uliastai.
 "Inner Mongolia": This region corresponded to most of modern Inner Mongolia and some neighbouring areas in Liaoning and Jilin provinces. The banners and tribes in this region came under six leagues (chuulghan): Jirim, Juuuda, Josutu, Xilingol, Ulanqab, and Yekejuu.
 "Taoxi Mongolia": The Alashan Öölüd and Ejine Torghuud banners were separate from the aimags of Outer Mongolia and the chuulghans of Inner Mongolia. This territory is equivalent to modern-day Alxa League, the westernmost part of what is now Inner Mongolia.
 The Chahar Banners were controlled by the military commander of Chahar (now Zhangjiakou). Their extent corresponded to southern Ulanqab and Bayannur in modern Inner Mongolia, plus the region around Zhangjiakou in Hebei province. At the same time, the jurisdiction of some border departments of Zhili and Shanxi provinces also belonged to this region.
 The Guihua Tümed banner was controlled by the military commander of Suiyuan (now Hohhot). This corresponds to the vicinities of the modern city of Hohhot. At the same time, the jurisdiction of some border departments of modern Shanxi province also belonged to this region.
 The Hulunbuir region in what is now northeastern Inner Mongolia was part of the jurisdiction of the General of Heilongjiang, one of the three generals of Manchuria.

The Inner Mongolian Chahar leader Ligdan Khan, a descendant of Genghis Khan, opposed and fought against the Qing until he died of smallpox in 1634. Thereafter, the Inner Mongols under his son Ejei Khan surrendered to the Qing and was given the title of Prince, and Inner Mongolian nobility became closely tied to the Qing royal family and intermarried with them extensively. Ejei Khan died in 1661 and was succeeded by his brother Abunai. After Abunai showed disaffection with Manchu Qing rule, he was placed under house arrest in 1669 in Shenyang and the Kangxi Emperor gave his title to his son Borni. Abunai then bid his time and then he and his brother Lubuzung revolted against the Qing in 1675 during the Revolt of the Three Feudatories, with 3,000 Chahar Mongol followers joining in on the revolt. The revolt was put down within two months, the Qing then crushed the rebels in a battle on 20 April 1675, killing Abunai and all his followers. Their title was abolished, all Chahar Mongol royal males were executed even if they were born to Manchu Qing princesses, and all Chahar Mongol royal females were sold into slavery except the Manchu Qing princesses. The Chahar Mongols were then put under the direct control of the Qing Emperor, unlike the other Inner Mongol leagues which maintained their autonomy.

Despite officially prohibiting Han Chinese settlement on the Manchu and Mongol lands, by the 18th century the Qing decided to settle Han refugees from northern China who were suffering from famine, floods, and drought into Manchuria and Inner Mongolia. As a result, the Han Chinese farmed 500,000 hectares in Manchuria and tens of thousands of hectares in Inner Mongolia by the 1780s.

Ordinary Mongols were not allowed to travel outside their own leagues. Mongols were forbidden by the Qing from crossing the borders of their banners, even into other Mongol Banners and from crossing into neidi (the Han Chinese 18 provinces) and were given serious punishments if they did in order to keep the Mongols divided against each other to benefit the Qing. Mongol pilgrims wanting to leave their banner's borders for religious reasons such as pilgrimage had to apply for passports to give them permission.

During the eighteenth century, growing numbers of Han Chinese settlers had illegally begun to move into the Inner Mongolian steppe. By 1791, there had been so many Han Chinese settlers in the Front Gorlos Banner that the jasak had petitioned the Qing government to legalise the status of the peasants who had already settled there.

During the nineteenth century, the Manchus were becoming increasingly sinicised and faced with the Russian threat, they began to encourage Han Chinese farmers to settle in both Mongolia and Manchuria. This policy was followed by subsequent governments. The railroads that were being built in these regions were especially useful to the Han Chinese settlers. Land was either sold by Mongol Princes, or leased to Han Chinese farmers, or simply taken away from the nomads and given to Han Chinese farmers.

A group of Han Chinese during the Qing dynasty called "Mongol followers" immigrated to Inner Mongolia who worked as servants for Mongols and Mongol princes and married Mongol women. Their descendants continued to marry Mongol women and changed their ethnicity to Mongol as they assimilated into the Mongol people, an example of this were the ancestors of Li Shouxin. They distinguished themselves apart from "true Mongols" 真蒙古.

Republic of China and the Second World War periods 

Outer Mongolia gained independence from the Qing dynasty in 1911, when the Jebtsundamba Khutugtu of the Khalkha was declared the Bogd Khan of Mongolia. Although almost all banners of Inner Mongolia recognised the Bogd Khan as the supreme ruler of Mongols, the internal strife within the region prevented a full reunification. The Mongol rebellions in Inner Mongolia were counterbalanced by princes who hoped to see a restored Qing dynasty in Manchuria and Mongolia, as they considered the theocratic rule of the Bogd Khan would be against their modernising objectives for Mongolia. Eventually, the newly formed Republic of China promised a new nation of five races (Han, Manchu, Mongol, Tibetan and Uyghur). and suppressed the Mongol rebellions in the area.

The Republic of China reorganised Inner Mongolia into provinces:
 Rehe province was created to include the Juuuda and Josutu leagues, plus the Chengde area in what is now northern Hebei.
 Chahar province was created to include Xilingol league as well as much of the former territory of the Eight Banners.
 Suiyuan province was created to include Ulanqab league, Yekejuu league, and the Hetao region (former Guihua Tümed territory).
 Hulunbuir stayed within Heilongjiang in Manchuria, which had become a province.
 Most of Jirim league came under the new province of Fengtian in southern Manchuria.
 Taoxi Mongolia, i.e., Alashan and Ejine leagues, was incorporated into neighbouring Gansu province. Later on Ningxia province was split out of northern Gansu, and Taoxi Mongolia became part of Ningxia.
Some Republic of China maps still show this structure.

The history of Inner Mongolia during the Second World War is complicated, with Japanese invasion and different kinds of resistance movements. In 1931, Manchuria came under the control of the Japanese puppet state Manchukuo, taking some Mongol areas in the Manchurian provinces (i.e., Hulunbuir and Jirim leagues) along. Rehe was also incorporated into Manchukuo in 1933, taking Juu Uda and Josutu leagues along with it. These areas were occupied by Manchukuo until the end of World War II in 1945.

In 1937, the Empire of Japan openly and fully invaded Republic of China. On 8 December 1937, Mongolian Prince Demchugdongrub (also known as "De Wang") declared independence for the remaining parts of Inner Mongolia (i.e., the Suiyuan and Chahar provinces) as Mengjiang, and signed agreements with Manchukuo and Japan. Its capital was established at Zhangbei (now in Hebei province), with the Japanese puppet government's control extending as far west as the Hohhot region. The Japanese advance was defeated by Hui Muslim General Ma Hongbin at the Battle of West Suiyuan and Battle of Wuyuan. Since 1945, Inner Mongolia has remained part of China.

The Mongol Ulanhu fought against the Japanese.

Ethnic Mongolian guerrilla units were created by the Kuomintang Nationalists to fight against the Japanese during the war in the late 30s and early 40s. These Mongol militias were created by the Ejine and Alashaa based commissioner's offices created by the Kuomintang. Prince Demchugdongrob's Mongols were targeted by Kuomintang Mongols to defect to the Republic of China. The Nationalists recruited 1,700 ethnic minority fighters in Inner Mongolia and created war zones in the Tumet Banner, Ulanchab League, and Ordos Yekejuu League.

The Inner Mongolian People's Republic was founded shortly after the Second World War. It existed from 9 September 1945 until 6 November 1945.

People's Republic of China 

The Communist movement gradually gained momentum as part of the Third Communist International in Inner Mongolia during the Japanese period. By the end of WWII, the Inner Mongolian faction of the ComIntern had a functional militia and actively opposed the attempts at independence by De Wang's Chinggisid princes on the grounds of fighting feudalism. Following the end of World War II, the Chinese Communists gained control of Manchuria as well as the Inner Mongolian Communists with decisive Soviet support and established the Inner Mongolia Autonomous Region in 1947. The Comintern army was absorbed into the People's Liberation Army. Initially, the autonomous region included just the Hulunbuir region. Over the next decade, as the communists established the People's Republic of China and consolidated control over mainland China, Inner Mongolia was expanded westwards to include five of the six original leagues (except Josutu League, which remains in Liaoning province), the northern part of the Chahar region, by then a league as well (southern Chahar remains in Hebei province), the Hetao region, and the Alashan and Ejine banners. Eventually, nearly all areas with sizeable Mongol populations were incorporated into the region, giving present-day Inner Mongolia its elongated shape. The leader of Inner Mongolia during that time, as both regional CPC secretary and head of regional government, was Ulanhu.

During the Cultural Revolution, the administration of Ulanhu was purged, and a wave of repressions was initiated against the Mongol population of the autonomous region. Among the victims in Inner Mongolia, 75 per cent were Mongols, even though they only constituted 10 per cent of the population. In 1969, much of Inner Mongolia was distributed among surrounding provinces, with Hulunbuir divided between Heilongjiang and Jilin, Jirim going to Jilin, Juu Uda to Liaoning, and the Alashan and Ejine region divided among Gansu and Ningxia. This decision was reversed in 1979.

Inner Mongolia has seen considerable development since Deng Xiaoping instituted Chinese economic reform in 1978. For about ten years since 2000, Inner Mongolia's GDP growth has been the highest in the country, (along with Guangdong) largely owing to the success of natural resource industries in the region. GDP growth has continually been over 10%, even 15% and connections with the Wolf Economy to the north has helped development. However, growth has come at a cost with huge amounts of pollution and degradation to the grasslands. Attempts to attract ethnic Chinese to migrate from other regions, as well as urbanise those rural nomads and peasants has led to huge amounts of corruption and waste in public spending, such as Ordos City. Acute uneven wealth distribution has further exacerbated ethnic tensions, many indigenous Mongolians feeling they are increasingly marginalised in their own homeland, leading to riots in 2011 and 2013.

On 31 August 2020, large protests broke out in ethnic Mongol communities due to unannounced plans by the Chinese government to phase out Mongolian-medium teaching.

Geography 

Officially Inner Mongolia is classified as one of the provincial-level divisions of North China, but its great stretch means that parts of it belong to Northeast China and Northwest China as well. It borders eight provincial-level divisions in all three of the aforementioned regions (Heilongjiang, Jilin, Liaoning, Hebei, Shanxi, Shaanxi, Ningxia, and Gansu), tying with Shaanxi for the greatest number of bordering provincial-level divisions. Most of its international border is with Mongolia, which, in Chinese, is sometimes called "Outer Mongolia", while a small portion is with Russia's Zabaykalsky Krai.

Inner Mongolia largely consists of the northern side of the North China Craton, a tilted and sedimented Precambrian block. In the extreme southwest is the edge of the Tibetan Plateau where the autonomous region's highest peak, Main Peak in the Helan Mountains reaches , and is still being pushed up today in short bursts. The northern part consists of the Mesozoic era Khingan Mountains, and is owing to the cooler climate more forested, chiefly with Manchurian elm, ash, birch, Mongolian oak and a number of pine and spruce species. Where discontinuous permafrost is present north of Hailar District, forests are almost exclusively coniferous. In the south, the natural vegetation is grassland in the east and very sparse in the arid west, and grazing is the dominant economic activity.

Owing to the ancient, weathered rocks lying under its deep sedimentary cover, Inner Mongolia is a major mining district, possessing large reserves of coal, iron ore and rare-earth minerals, which have made it a major industrial region today.

Climate 

Due to its elongated shape, Inner Mongolia has a four-season monsoon climate with regional variations. The winters in Inner Mongolia are very long, cold, and dry with frequent blizzards, though snowfall is so light that Inner Mongolia has no modern glaciers even on the highest Helan peaks. The spring is short, mild and arid, with large, dangerous sandstorms, whilst the summer is very warm to hot and relatively humid except in the west where it remains dry. Autumn is brief and sees a steady cooling, with temperatures below  reached in October in the north and November in the south.

Officially, most of Inner Mongolia is classified as either a cold arid or steppe regime (Köppen BWk, BSk, respectively). The small portion besides these are classified as humid continental (Köppen Dwa/Dwb) in the northeast, or subarctic (Köppen Dwc) in the far north near Hulunbuir.

Administrative divisions 

Inner Mongolia is divided into twelve prefecture-level divisions. Until the late 1990s, most of Inner Mongolia's prefectural regions were known as Leagues, a usage retained from Mongol divisions of the Qing dynasty. Similarly, county-level divisions are often known as Banners. Since the 1990s, numerous Leagues have converted into prefecture-level cities, although Banners remain. The restructuring led to the conversion of primate cities in most leagues to convert to districts administratively (i.e.: Hailar, Jining and Dongsheng). Some newly founded prefecture-level cities have chosen to retain the original name of League (i.e.: Hulunbuir, Bayannur and Ulanqab), some have adopted the Chinese name of their primate city (Chifeng, Tongliao), and one League (Yekejuu) simply renamed itself Ordos. Despite these recent administrative changes, there is no indication that the Alxa, Hinggan, and Xilingol Leagues will convert to prefecture-level cities in the near future.

These prefecture-level divisions are in turn subdivided into 102 county-level divisions, including 22 districts, 11 county-level cities, 17 counties, 49 banners, and 3 autonomous banners. Those are in turn divided into 1425 township-level divisions, including 532 towns, 407 townships, 277 sums, eighteen ethnic townships, one ethnic sum, and 190 subdistricts. At the end of 2017, the total population of Inner-Mongolia is 25.29 million.

Urban areas

Economy 
Farming of crops such as wheat takes precedence along the river valleys. In the more arid grasslands, herding of goats, sheep and so on is a traditional method of subsistence. Forestry and hunting are somewhat important in the Greater Khingan ranges in the east. Reindeer herding is carried out by Evenks in the Evenk Autonomous Banner. More recently, growing grapes and winemaking have become an economic factor in the Wuhai area.

Inner Mongolia has an abundance of resources especially coal, cashmere, natural gas, rare-earth elements, and has more deposits of naturally occurring niobium, zirconium and beryllium than any other province-level region in China. The region is also a source of crude oil, with sites such as the Xifeng oil field producing tens of thousands of barrels per day. However, in the past, the exploitation and utilisation of resources were rather inefficient, which resulted in poor returns from rich resources. Inner Mongolia is also an important coal production base, with more than a quarter of the world's coal reserves located in the province. It plans to double annual coal output by 2010 (from the 2005 volume of 260 million tons) to 500 million tons of coal a year.

Industry in Inner Mongolia has grown up mainly around coal, power generation, forestry-related industries, and related industries.
Inner Mongolia now encourages six competitive industries: energy, chemicals, metallurgy, equipment manufacturing, processing of farm (including dairy) produce, and high technology. Well-known Inner Mongolian enterprises include companies such as ERDOS, Yili, and Mengniu.

The nominal GDP of Inner Mongolia in 2015 was 1.8 trillion yuan (US$272.1 billion), with an average annual increase of 10% from the period 2010–2015. Its per capita GDP reached US$11,500 in 2015, ranking 4th among all the 31 provinces of China, only after Shanghai, Beijing and Tianjin.

As with much of China, economic growth has led to a boom in construction, including new commercial development and large apartment complexes.

In addition to its large reserves of natural resources, Inner Mongolia also has the largest usable wind power capacity in China thanks to strong winds which develop in the province's grasslands. Some private companies have set up wind parks in parts of Inner Mongolia such as Bailingmiao, Hutengliang and Zhouzi.

East of Jilantai, Inner Mongolia, there is a ballistic missile training area used by the People's Liberation Army Rocket Force (PLARF) to train missile crews for mobile missile launchers, their support vehicles, and silo-based ballistic missiles.

Economic and Technological Development Zones 
 Baotou National Rare-Earth Hi-Tech Industrial Development Zone
 Erenhot Border Economic Cooperation Area
 Hohhot Export Processing Zone
Industries encouraged in the export processing zone include Electronics Assembly & Manufacturing, Telecommunications Equipment, Garment and Textiles Production, Trading and Distribution, Biotechnology/Pharmaceuticals, Food/Beverage Processing, Instruments & Industrial Equipment Production, Medical Equipment and Supplies, Shipping/Warehousing/Logistics, Heavy Industry.
 Hohhot Economic and Technological Development Zone
 Hohhot Export Processing Zone
 Manzhouli Border Economic Cooperation Area

Transport

Railway 
Lines wholly or partly in Inner Mongolia include:
 Beijing–Baotou railway (Jingbao railway)
 Baotou–Lanzhou railway
 Beijing–Tongliao railway
 Harbin–Manzhouli railway
 Jiayuguan–Ceke railway
 Jining–Tongliao railway
 Linhe–Ceke railway
 Nenjiang–Greater Khingan Forest railway
 Tongliao–Ranghulu railway

Railway stations in Inner Mongolia include:
 List of stations on Jingbao railway

Government and politics 

Under the Constitution of the People's Republic of China, articles 112–122, autonomous regions have limited autonomy in both the political and economic arena.  Autonomous regions have more discretion in administering economic policy in the region in accordance with national guidelines. Structurally, the Chairman—who legally must be an ethnic minority and is usually ethnic Mongolian—is always kept in check by the Communist Party Regional Committee Secretary, who is usually from a different part of China (to reduce corruption) and Han Chinese. , the current party secretary is Shi Taifeng. The Inner Mongolian government and its subsidiaries follow roughly the same structure as that of a Chinese province. With regards to economic policy, as a part of increased federalism characteristics in China, Inner Mongolia has become more independent in implementing its own economic roadmap.

The position of Chairman of Inner Mongolia alternates between Khorchin Mongols in the east and the Tumed Mongols in the west. Since the end of the Cultural Revolution, this convention has not been broken. The family of Ulanhu has retained influence in regional politics ever since the founding the People's Republic. His son Buhe and granddaughter Bu Xiaolin both served as Chairman of the region.

Demographics 

When the autonomous region was established in 1947, Han Chinese comprised 83.6% of the population, while the Mongols comprised 14.8% of the population.  By 2010, the percentage of Han Chinese had dropped to 79.5%. While the Hetao region along the Yellow River has always alternated between farmers from the south and nomads from the north, the most recent wave of Han Chinese migration began in the early 18th century with encouragement from the Qing dynasty, and continued into the 20th century. Han Chinese live mostly in the Hetao region as well as various population centres in central and eastern Inner Mongolia. Over 70% of Mongols are concentrated in less than 18% of Inner Mongolia's territory (Hinggan League, and the prefectures of Tongliao and Chifeng).

Mongols are the second largest ethnic group, comprising 17.11% of the population as of the 2010 census. They include many diverse Mongolian-speaking groups; groups such as the Buryats and the Oirats are also officially considered to be Mongols in China. In addition to the Manchus, other Tungusic ethnic groups, the Oroqen, and the Evenks also populate parts of northeastern Inner Mongolia.

Many of the traditionally nomadic Mongols have settled in permanent homes as their pastoral economy was collectivised during the Mao era, and some have taken jobs in cities as migrant labourers; however, some Mongols continue in their nomadic tradition. In practice, highly educated Mongols tend to migrate to big urban centers after which they become essentially indistinct with ethnic Han Chinese populations.

Inter-marriage between Mongol and non-Mongol populations is very common, particularly in areas where Mongols are in regular contact with other groups. There was little cultural stigma within Mongol families for marrying outside the ethnic group, and in urban centers in particular, Mongol men and women married non-Mongols at relatively similar rates. The rates of intermarriage stands in very sharp contrast to ethnic Tibetans and Uyghurs in their respective autonomous regions. By the 1980s, for instance, in the former Jirim League, nearly 40% of marriages with at least one Mongol spouse was a mixed Mongol-Han Chinese marriage. However, anecdotal reports have also demonstrated an increase in Mongol-female, Han Chinese-male pairings in which the woman is of a rural background, ostensibly shutting rural Mongol males from the marriage market as the sex ratio in China becomes more skewed with a much higher proportion of men.

There is also a significant number of Hui and Koreans.

Population numbers exclude members of the People's Liberation Army in active service based in Inner Mongolia.

Language and culture

Alongside Chinese, Mongolian is the official provincial language of the Inner Mongolia Autonomous Region, where there are at least 4.1 million ethnic Mongols. Across the whole of China, the language is spoken by roughly half of the country's 5.8 million ethnic Mongols (2005 estimate) However, the exact number of Mongolian speakers in China is unknown, as there is no data available on the language proficiency of that country's citizens. The use of Mongolian in China, specifically in Inner Mongolia, has witnessed periods of decline and revival over the last few hundred years. The language experienced a decline during the late Qing period, a revival between 1947 and 1965, a second decline between 1966 and 1976, a second revival between 1977 and 1992, and a third decline between 1995 and 2012. However, in spite of the decline of the Mongolian language in some of Inner Mongolia's urban areas and educational spheres, the ethnic identity of the urbanised Chinese-speaking Mongols is most likely going to survive due to the presence of urban ethnic communities. The multilingual situation in Inner Mongolia does not appear to obstruct efforts by ethnic Mongols to preserve their language. Although an unknown number of Mongols in China, such as the Tumets, may have completely or partially lost the ability to speak their language, they are still registered as ethnic Mongols and continue to identify themselves as ethnic Mongols. The children of inter-ethnic Mongol-Chinese marriages also claim to be and are registered as ethnic Mongols.

By law, all street signs, commercial outlets, and government documents must be bilingual, written in both Mongolian and Chinese. There are three Mongolian TV channels in the Inner Mongolia Satellite TV network. In public transportation, all announcements are to be bilingual.

Mongols in Inner Mongolia speak Mongolian dialects such as Chakhar, Xilingol, Baarin, Khorchin and Kharchin Mongolian and, depending on definition and analysis, further dialects or closely related independent Central Mongolic languages such as Ordos, Khamnigan, Barghu Buryat and the arguably Oirat dialect Alasha. The standard pronunciation of Mongolian in China is based on the Chakhar dialect of the Plain Blue Banner, located in central Inner Mongolia, while the grammar is based on all Southern Mongolian dialects. This is different from the Mongolian state, where the standard pronunciation is based on the closely related Khalkha dialect. There are a number of independent languages spoken in Hulunbuir such as the somewhat more distant Mongolic language Dagur and the Tungusic language Evenki. Officially, even the Evenki dialect Oroqin is considered a language.

The Han Chinese of Inner Mongolia speak a variety of dialects, depending on the region. Those in the eastern parts tend to speak Northeastern Mandarin, which belongs to the Mandarin group of dialects; those in the central parts, such as the Yellow River valley, speak varieties of Jin, another subdivision of Chinese, due to its proximity to other Jin-speaking areas in China such as the Shanxi province. Cities such as Hohhot and Baotou both have their unique brand of Jin Chinese such as the Zhangjiakou–Hohhot dialect which are sometimes incomprehensible with dialects spoken in northeastern regions such as Hailar.

The vast grasslands have long symbolised Inner Mongolia. Mongolian art often depicts the grassland in an uplifting fashion and emphasises Mongolian nomadic traditions. The Mongols of Inner Mongolia still practice their traditional arts. Inner Mongolian cuisine has Mongol roots and consists of dairy-related products and hand-held lamb. In recent years, franchises based on hot pot have appeared in Inner Mongolia, the best known of which is Little Sheep. Notable Inner Mongolian commercial brand names include Mengniu and Yili, both of which began as dairy product and ice cream producers.

Among the Han Chinese of Inner Mongolia, Shanxi opera is a popular traditional form of entertainment. See also: Shanxi. A popular career in Inner Mongolia is circus acrobatics. The internationally known Inner Mongolia Acrobatic Troupe travels and performs with the renowned Ringling Bros. and Barnum & Bailey Circus.

Religion 

According to a survey held in 2004 by the Minzu University of China, about 80% of the population of the region practice the worship of Heaven (that is named Tian in the Chinese tradition and Tenger in the Mongolian tradition) and of ovoo/aobao.

Official statistics report that 10.9% of the population (3 million people) are members of Tibetan Buddhist groups. According to the Chinese Spiritual Life Survey of 2007 and the Chinese General Social Survey of 2009, Christianity is the religious identity of 3.2% of the population of the region; and Chinese ancestral religion the professed belonging of 2.36%, while a demographic analysis of the year 2010 reported that Muslims comprise the 0.91%.

The cult of Genghis Khan, present in the form of various Genghis Khan temples, is a tradition of Mongolian shamanism, in which he is considered a cultural hero and divine ancestor, an embodiment of the Tenger (Heaven, God of Heaven). His worship in special temples, greatly developed in Inner Mongolia since the 1980s, is also shared by the Han Chinese, claiming his spirit as the founding principle of the Yuan dynasty.

Tibetan Buddhism (Mongolian Buddhism, locally also known as "Yellow Buddhism") is the dominant form of Buddhism in Inner Mongolia, also practised by many Han Chinese. Another form of Buddhism, practised by the Chinese, are the schools of Chinese Buddhism.

Tourism 
In the capital city Hohhot:
 Da Zhao Temple is a Buddhist temple built in 1580. Dazhao Temple is known for three sites: a statue of Buddha made from silver, elaborate carvings of dragons, and murals.
 Five-pagoda Temple is located in the capital of Inner Mongolia Hohhot. It is also called Jingangzuo Dagoba, used to be one building of the Cideng Temple (Temple of Merciful Light) built in 1727.
 Residence of Gurun Princess Kejing is a mansion typical of Qing dynasty architectural style that was built in 1705 by the Kangxi Emperor for his daughter.
 Wanbu-Huayanjing Pagoda in Hohhot. It was built during the reign of Emperor Shengzong (983–1031) of the Khitan Liao dynasty (907–1125) and is still well preserved.
 Xiaozhao Temple, also known as Chongfu temple, is a Buddhist temple built in 1697 and favoured by the Kangxi Emperor of the Qing dynasty.
 Xilitu Zhao / Siregtu juu Temple is the largest Buddhist temple in the Höhhot area, and once the center of power of Tibetan Buddhism in the region.
 Zhaojun Tomb is the tomb of Wang Zhaojun, a Han dynasty palace lady-in-waiting who became the consort of the Xiongnu ruler Huhanye Shanyu in 33BC.

Elsewhere in Inner Mongolia:
 The Mausoleum of Genghis Khan, the cenotaph of Genghis Khan, is located in Ordos City.
 Bashang Grasslands, on the border close to Beijing, is a popular retreat for urban residents wanting to get a taste of grasslands life.
 The Arshihaty Stone Forest in Hexigten Global Geopark has magnificent granite rock formations formed from natural erosion.
 Xiangshawan, or "singing sands gorge", is located in the Gobi Desert and contains numerous tourist attractions including sand sledding and camel rides.
 Remains of Zhongjing (Central Capital) built in 1003 by Emperor Shengzong of the Khitan Liao dynasty (907–1125) in Ningcheng County.
 Remains of Shangjing (Upper Capital) built in 918 by Yelu Abaoji the 1st emperor of the Khitan Liao dynasty (907–1125). Also called Huangdu it was one of the five capitals of the Liao dynasty.
 Zuling Mausoleum of Abaoji Khan. It was built in 926 for Abaoji the 1st Emperor of the Liao dynasty. Located north-west of Shifangzi village.
 Tablets of Juyan. Han dynasty (206 BC – 220 AD) inscriptions on wood and bamboo. In 1930 Folke Bergman of the Sino-Swedish expedition first discovered 10,000 tablets at Ejin Khoshuu in the Gobi Desert.
 Ruins of Shangdu (Xanadu) the Summer Capital of the Mongol Yuan dynasty built in 1256 by Kublai Khan.
 White pagoda of the Mongol Yuan dynasty (1279–1368) in Kailu County, Tongliao. It is still well preserved.
 Ruins of Chagan Khoto capital of the last Mongol Great Khan Ligden (1588–1634). Located in Ar Horqin Banner.

One of China's space vehicle launch facilities, Jiuquan Satellite Launch Center, is located in the Alxa League's Ejin Banner, in the west of Inner Mongolia. It was founded in 1958, making it the PRC's first launch facility. As of 2021, Jiuquan has documented more launches than any other launch facilities in China, and is still the only launch site for crewed space missions (Shenzhou program). While geologically located inside Inner Mongolia, the launch center is named after Jiuquan, which is the nearest urban center in the nearby province of Gansu. As military facilities, the core areas at Jiuquan Center are highly restricted and can only be visited by tourist buses operated by the center, while the visitor center is open to the public and can be accessed from the south gate.

Inner Mongolia is also home to the two (and only two) space vehicles landing sites in China, the Siziwang Banner Landing Site in Ulanqab and the Dongfeng Landing Site in Alxa.

Education

Colleges and universities

Language policy and protest 
Inner Mongolia under the People's Republic of China has historically allowed the Mongolian language as a medium of instruction. An 1979 article from the People's Daily praises the re-establishment of Mongolian-language education after "interference and vandalism by the Gang of Four" during the Cultural Revolution.

It was reported by The New York Times on 31 August 2020 that in the summer 2020, the Chinese government announced a new education policy, which called for Chinese to gradually replace Mongolian as the language of instruction in three subjects, including language and literature, politics, and history, in elementary and middle schools around the Inner Mongolia region. Thousands of ethnic Mongolians in northern China gathered to protest the policy.

Image gallery

See also 

 Leagues of Inner Mongolia
 List of administrative divisions of Inner Mongolia
 Major national historical and cultural sites in Inner Mongolia
 Winter storms of 2009–10 in East Asia

Notes

References

Further reading 
 Wang, Liping. "From Masterly Brokers to Compliant Protégées: The Frontier Governance System and the Rise of Ethnic Confrontation in China–Inner Mongolia, 1900–1930." American Journal of Sociology 120.6 (2015): 1641–1689.
 Williams, Dee Mack. Beyond great walls: environment, identity, and development on the Chinese grasslands of Inner Mongolia (Stanford University Press, 2002). Online
 Borjigin, Monkbat. "A case study of Language education in the Inner Mongolia " (Archive;). Journal of Chiba University Eurasian Society 16, 261–266, 2014-09-25. Chiba University Eurasian Society. See profile at Chiba University Repository. See profile at CiNii. – In English with a Japanese abstract.

External links 

  Inner Mongolia Government website
  Inner Mongolia Government website
 Welcome to Inner Mongolia-Mongolia Tours with Samar Magic Tours
 

 
Autonomous regions of China
Mongols in China
1947 establishments in China
States and territories established in 1947
Inner Asia
Historical regions